Vendôme is a subprefecture of the department of Loir-et-Cher, France. It is also the department's third-biggest commune with 15,856 inhabitants (2019).
 
It is one of the main towns along the river Loir. The river divides itself at the entrance of Vendôme, intersecting it into numerous different arms. The town has a rich medieval history and many historical monuments.

History

Vendôme (in ) appears originally to have been a Gallic , replaced later by a feudal castle, around which the modern town arose.

Bouchard VI, Count of Vendôme and Castres (died ), left as his heiress his sister Catherine, the wife of John of Bourbon, count of La Marche. The county of Vendôme was raised to the rank of a duchy and a peerage of France for Charles of Bourbon (1515); his son , king of Navarre, was the father of Henry IV, who gave the duchy of Vendôme in 1598 to his illegitimate son César de Bourbon (1594–1665). The last of his family in the male line was Louis XIV's famous general,  (1645–1712).

The , leader of 6,000 French troops in the American Revolutionary War, was born in Vendôme.

Geography
The town lies on the river Loir, which here divides into numerous arms intersecting the town.

Administration
Vendôme is the capital of the arrondissement of Vendôme in the Loir-et-Cher department, of which it is a sub-prefecture. It has a tribunal of first instance.

Population

Sights
On the south, it is overlooked by an eminence on which stand the ruins of the castle of the counts of Vendôme. The abbey-church of the Holy Trinity has a façade in the florid Gothic style. Abbey buildings of various periods lie round the church. The church of La Madeleine (15th century) is surmounted by a stone spire, an imitation of that of the abbey. The tower of Saint-Martin (16th century) represents the vanished church of that name.

Other monuments are: the old gate, the Porte Saint-Georges; its river front is composed of two large crenelated and machicolated towers, connected by a pavilion, and the ancient hospital of Saint-Jacques that afterwards became a college of the Oratorians, then a lycée for boys and that is now occupied by the town administration offices. The charming chapel, in the most florid Gothic style, is preserved. In the garden surrounding, is located the tourism office in an ancient building called l'Orangerie (facing the public library). The town has a well-known archaeological and scientific society, and possesses a library with more than three hundred manuscripts, and a museum, mostly archaeological, in front of which stands a statue of the poet Pierre de Ronsard. There is also a statue of Marshal Rochambeau, born at Vendôme in 1725. Some interesting houses of the 15th and 16th centuries survive.

Twin towns – sister cities

Vendôme is twinned with:
 Gevelsberg, Germany
 Hampton, United States
 Rizhao, China

See also
Communes of the Loir-et-Cher department
List of counts and dukes of Vendôme
Oratory of Jesus

References

Communes of Loir-et-Cher
Subprefectures in France
Burial sites of the House of Albret
Orléanais